Roy Kusumoto is an American businessman who founded Solectron in 1977. He started the company as a small assembly shop that under the input of Winston Chen and Ko Nishimura would grow into an electronics manufacturing giant with over $20 billion in sales and 65,000 employees.

Kusomoto had worked at Atari and founded another company Optical Diodes before starting Solectron. Originally intended as a solar energy company, Solectron first took up work as a peak period manufacturing service provider to Silicon Valley companies as a way of raising funds for the original solar purpose, but this pursuit in this sector never materialized.

References 

American technology company founders
American computer businesspeople
American people of Japanese descent
Living people
Year of birth missing (living people)